The New Haven Register is a daily newspaper published in New Haven, Connecticut. It is owned by Hearst Communications.  The Register's main office is located at 100 Gando Drive in New Haven. The Register was established about 1812 and is one of the oldest continuously published newspapers in the U.S. In the early 20th century it was bought by John Day Jackson. The Jackson family owned the Register, published weekday evenings and Saturday and Sunday mornings, and The Journal-Courier, a morning weekday paper, until they were combined in 1987 into a seven-day morning Register.

The Register covers 19 towns and cities within New Haven and Middlesex counties, including New Haven. The newspaper also had one reporter in Hartford, the state capital, who covered state politics, but as of March 2008 removed that reporter, leaving New Haven's major daily without day-to-day coverage of state offices and the General Assembly. In order to fill that void, the paper signed a deal with CTNewsJunkie.com to provide coverage of the Connecticut state government.

History

John Day Jackson passed control of the papers to his sons, Richard and Lionel Jackson, then to Lionel's son, Lionel "Stewart" Jackson Jr. The paper was sold to Mark Goodson, the television producer, then to a company headed by Ralph Ingersoll before being sold to the company recently known as Journal Register Company. After repeated bankruptcy filings, the paper was sold to Hearst Newspapers in 2017 by JRC successor Digital First Media.

The Register underwent both a newsroom union decertification and a suit brought by women newsroom employees, both successful, in the late 1970s and 1980s. It enjoyed its highest circulation, peaking at more than 100,000, in the mid-1980s.

On February 21, 2009, the Journal Register Company and twenty-six (26) of its affiliates (including the Register), filed for Chapter 11 of the United States Bankruptcy Code. It has since emerged as part of Digital First Media.

On March 4, 2012, the Register closed its printing operation and sourced printing of the newspaper to the Hartford Courant.

On September 20, 2014, the Register officially relocated its headquarters closer to the North Haven, Connecticut, city line. The former Register building was renovated and became a Jordan's Furniture.

In 2017, the paper was sold to Hearst.

Newsroom 
The group publisher of Hearst publications in Connecticut is Mike Deluca.

Competitors 
As of 2015, the paper had a weekday circulation of 64,210, the second largest in the state after the Hartford Courant.

Its main daily competitors are new Hearst stablemate the Post, located in Bridgeport, which covers Stratford, Milford, and portions of the lower Naugatuck Valley (Ansonia, Derby, Oxford, Seymour, and Shelton), and the Waterbury Republican-American, which covers Greater Waterbury, Litchfield County, and the Naugatuck Valley.

The Register also shares part of its circulation area with Elm City Newspapers, a chain of weekly newspapers which also share an owner and a New Haven headquarters building with the Register.

See also
List of newspapers in Connecticut

References

External links
 New Haven Register Website

21st Century Media publications
Mass media in New Haven, Connecticut
Newspapers published in Connecticut
Mass media in New Haven County, Connecticut